Daniele Bernazzani (born 28 January 1963) is an Italian association football coach and former professional player. He currently is the coach of Inter youth team.

Career

Playing career
Bernazzani played as a defender for Voghera, Internazionale, Pistoiese, Pisa, Reggina and Mantova.

Coaching career
After an 18-year career as a player, Bernazzani moved on to coaching, initially with the Piacenza youth team in 1998. That lasted until 2000 when he replaced first-team Piacenza coach Luigi Simoni who had been sacked. Following the conclusion of the 1999–2000 Serie A season, Bernazzani returned to the Piacenza youth teams for three more years (first for Allievi and second and the third season for Primavera). In 2003, he moved on to the Inter "Primavera" U20 youth team, serving as head coach until 2006 and again since 26 March 2012 (as Andrea Stramaccioni promoted to first team), winning 2006 league title. Bernazzani was the coach of "Allievi Nazionali" U17 youth team of Inter from 2006 to 2008, with one league title in 2008.

Bernazzani was the technical assistant of the first team from 2008 to 2012, serving Mourinho, Benítez, Leonardo, Gasperini, and Ranieri.

References

1963 births
Living people
Italian footballers
Association football defenders
Serie A players
Serie B players
A.S.D. AVC Vogherese 1919 players
Inter Milan players
Pisa S.C. players
U.S. Pistoiese 1921 players
Reggina 1914 players
Mantova 1911 players
Italian football managers
Piacenza Calcio 1919 non-playing staff
Piacenza Calcio 1919 managers
Inter Milan non-playing staff